Ophiusa kenricki is a moth of the family Erebidae first described by George Thomas Bethune-Baker in 1906. It is found in New Guinea.

References

Ophiusa
Moths described in 1906